Sir Ralph Staley or Ralph de Stavelegh (c.1362-c.1420) was lord of the Manor of Staley Hall, Stalybridge, England. His stone effigy is to be found in St Michael and All Angels Church, Mottram.

References

External links
 "STAVELEY, Sir Ralph" at The History of Parliament Online

People from Stalybridge
Year of birth uncertain